Athanasios Koutsogiannis (born 3 April 1956) is a Greek cross-country skier. He competed in the men's 15 kilometre event at the 1976 Winter Olympics.

References

1956 births
Living people
Greek male cross-country skiers
Olympic cross-country skiers of Greece
Cross-country skiers at the 1976 Winter Olympics
Place of birth missing (living people)